The UEFA European Under-19 Championship 2009 Final Tournament was held in Ukraine in the cities of Donetsk and Mariupol. Players born after 1 January 1990 were eligible to participate in this competition.

Qualification
Qualification for the final tournament was played over two stages:

 2009 UEFA European Under-19 Championship qualification – 2 October 2008 – 27 November 2008
 2009 UEFA European Under-19 Championship elite qualification – 1 March 2009 – 31 May 2009

The following teams had qualified for the tournament:
 
 
 
 
 
 
 
  (host)

Squads

Group A

Group B

Knock-out stage

Bracket

Semi-finals

Final

Goalscorers
4 goals

 Nathan Delfouneso

3 goals

 Henri Lansbury
 Danijel Aleksić
 Denys Harmash

2 goals

 Danny Welbeck
 Yacine Brahimi
 Milan Milanović
 Joselu
 Kyrylo Petrov

1 goal

 Matthew Briggs
 Dan Gosling
 Joseph Mattock 
 Nile Ranger
 Magaye Gueye
 Alfred N'Diaye
 Dejan Dimitrov
 Matic Fink
 Iago Falque 
 Orhan Mustafi
 Alexandre Pasche 
 Sébastien Wüthrich 
 Eren Albayrak 
 Sercan Yıldırım 
 Dmytro Korkishko
 Serhiy Rybalka
 Yevhen Shakhov

References

External links

Official Site

 
2009
2008–09 in European football
E
2009
July 2009 sports events in Europe
August 2009 sports events in Europe
2009 in youth association football